Sonja Larsen (born February 1, 1941) is a former American politician from the state of Iowa who served as a Republican in the Iowa House of Representatives for Ottumwa's 89th House District from 1979 to 1981, succeeding Charles Poncy before she was in turn succeeded by him the following election.

Larsen was born in Elk Horn, Shelby County, Iowa in 1941 to Marie and Einar Leistad. She attended Elk Horn-Kimballton Community schools, graduating in 1959. She married Richard Larsen, having three children.

References

1941 births
Living people
Republican Party members of the Iowa House of Representatives
People from Shelby County, Iowa
20th-century American politicians